Madhumita Sarcar is an Indian  actress from Kolkata, known for playing the lead roles of Pakhi Ghosh Dostidaar Singha Roy in Bojhena Se Bojhena and Dr. Emon Mukherjee in Kusum Dola.   She is most popular for her commercially and critically successful Movie  'Cheeni' .

Filmography

Web series

Television

Mahalaya

Music videos

Social media links

References 

Year of birth missing (living people)
Living people
Place of birth missing (living people)
Indian television actresses
Indian soap opera actresses